The 2018 Filoil Flying V Preseason Premier Cup (also known as the Hanes Presents 2018 Chooks-to-Go Filoil Flying V Preseason Premier Cup for sponsorship reasons) was the thirteenth preseason high school and collegiate basketball tournament organized by Filoil Flying V Sports. All 8 teams from the UAAP and 10 teams from the NCAA, together with the 23-man Gilas Pilipinas pool for the 2023 FIBA Basketball World Cup to be hosted by the Philippines competed in the senior's tournament.

This is the first season to be broadcast on ESPN 5, after ending its 10-year relationship with ABS-CBN Sports which was concluded following the 2016 edition of the cup.

Teams

Seniors' Division

Juniors' Division

Tournament format 
Due to different number of groups in men's and juniors' division, each had its own competition format.

Men's division 
The tournament format for men's division are as follows:
 During elimination round, teams will only play against teams in their group in a single round-robin schedule.
 At the end of the eliminations, the top four teams in each group will advance to the quarterfinal round.
 At the quarterfinals:
 Seeds #1 in group A meets #4 of group B (QF1)
 Seeds #2 in group B meets #3 of group A (QF2)
 Seeds #1 in group B meets #4 of group A (QF3)
 Seeds #2 in group A meets #3 of group B (QF4)
 Winner of QF1 meets winner of QF2 while QF3 winner meets QF4 winner in the semifinals.
 Winners of the semifinals will play for the Final round, while losers will battle for third place.
 The quotient system shall be applied in case of a tie in the standings between two or more teams.
 Only one foreign player shall play at a time in the court.

Juniors' division 
The tournament format for junior's division are as follows:
 During elimination round, teams will only play against teams in their group in a single round-robin schedule.
 The top six teams in overall standings will qualify for the playoffs. The top two teams automatically advances to the semifinals.
 At the quarterfinals, team #3 meets #6 while #4 meets #5.
 At the semifinals, winners of the quarterfinals between #3 and #6 will face team #2, while #1 will play against the winner between #4 and #5.
 Winners of the semifinals will play for the finals, while losers will battle for third place.
 The quotient system shall be applied in case of a tie in the standings between two or more teams.

Men's division

Elimination round

Group A

Team standings

Schedule

Results 

Number of asterisks (*) denotes the number of overtime periods.

Group B

Team standings

Schedule

Results 

Number of asterisks (*) denotes the number of overtime periods.

Bracket

Quarterfinals 
All times are local (UTC+8).

Semifinals 
All times are local (UTC+8).

Battle for Third 
All times are local (UTC+8).

Final
All times are local (UTC+8).

Juniors' division

Elimination round

Team standings

Schedule

Results 

Number of asterisks (*) denotes the number of overtime periods.

Bracket

Semifinals 
All times are local (UTC+8).

Battle for Third 
All times are local (UTC+8).

Final
All times are local (UTC+8).

Final standings
Juniors

Seniors

Individual awards
Juniors

Most Valuable Player: Clint Escamis ( Malayan High School of Science)
Mythical Five:
Clint Escamis ( Malayan High School of Science)
Briedyn Smith ( Malayan High School of Science)
Inand Fornilos ( La Salle Greenhills)
Royce Alforque ( FEU)
Rhayyan Amsali ( San Beda)
Best Defensive Player: Inand Fornilos ( La Salle Greenhills)

Seniors
Most Valuable Player: Angelo Kouame ( Ateneo)
Mythical Five:
Angelo Kouame ( Ateneo)
Justine Baltazar ( La Salle)
Thirdy Ravena ( Ateneo)
Javee Mocon ( San Beda)
Matt Nieto ( Ateneo)
Best Defensive Player: Prince Eze ( Perpetual Help)

References

External links 
 

2018–19 in Philippine college basketball